The University of Cincinnati Bearcat Bands (often accompanied by the phrase The UC Band Is Damn Good or TUCBIDG) make up the university's athletic band program and are distinct and separate from the College Conservatory of Music. The Bearcat Bands serve as both an academic class and a student group as an independent department within the Division of Student Affairs.

Ensembles
The Bearcat Bands consists of multiple ensembles. Many members of the marching band participate in other Bearcat Bands. All the ensembles combine for about 130 public performances each year, or about one every three days.

Marching Band
The UC Bearcat Marching Band is the most visible Bearcat band and performs at all home football games, select away football games, as well as any bowl games in which the team may compete. In addition to football games, the Bearcat Marching Band also performs for events such as UC Convocation, area marching competitions, and various events around Cincinnati.

Big 12 Flags (since 2023)

Pep Band
The UC Pep Band performs for all home men's and women's basketball games as well as any American Athletic Conference (The American) or NCAA tournament games. In addition to basketball games, the members of the Pep Band are often called upon to perform at various performances for the university and other organizations in the Cincinnati area.

Concert Band
The UC Concert Band consists of two or more groups of students, with at least one being a traditional concert band arrangement and the other varying due to available instrumentation. Annual performances of the Concert Band include the Memorial Day Ceremony in Eden Park and an end-of-year concert usually held in the first week of June at CCM. Some members of the Concert Band participate in the performances of other area ensembles.

Jazz Band
The UC Jazz Band performs at various gigs around the city including Coney Island. The group gives students an opportunity to play instruments such as jazz guitar, bass guitar, drum set, keyboard, and various saxophones and clarinets.

Instrumentation

The Marching Band usually consists of these numbers.  The Pep Bands for Men's Basketball and Women's Basketball games are divided into fourths.

The Flute/Piccolo section consists of approximately 16 members.

The Clarinet section consists of approximately 25 members.

The Saxophone section consists of approximately 36 members.

The Trumpet section consists of approximately 32 members.

The Horn/Mellophone section consists of approximately 16 members.

The Trombone section consists of approximately 22 members.

The Baritone section consists of approximately 8 members.

The Tuba section consists of approximately 14 members.

The Percussion section consists of approximately 10 Snares, 7 Tenor Drums, 7 varying size Bass Drums,  14 Cymbals, and 14 in the Front Ensemble.

The Color Guard consists of approximately 35 members.

There are 3 feature twirlers.

There are 4 Drum Majors.

Performance style
The marching band uses a Glide step when performing. The marching snare section uses Traditional Grip while playing.  The Bearcat Marching Band is known for its contemporary approach to both music and drill design.  Over 250 UC students come together to form the band's membership.  This includes the all instrumentalists, the Bearcat Guard, Twirlers, and Drum Majors corps.

Organization

The director of bands is Mr. Christopher Nichter (since 2017).  The Associate Director is Mr. Nick Angelis (with the group since 2005). The Band Announcer is Mr. Randy Smith (since 2002).

Student leadership
There is also a band council which consists of student members of the band.  The executives of the council consist of a president, vice president, treasurer, social coordinator, publications coordinator, and historian.  The council meets biweekly and aids the band through such things as coordinating recruiting activities, organizing social events, editing and publishing the band's newsletter, collecting band dues, and maintaining the band's history and traditions.  The council is also charged with the upkeep of the band's guiding document and constitution, The Words to Live By.

Another organization which helps provide service for the Bearcat Bands is the Theta chapter of Tau Beta Sigma, the co-ed service sorority for collegiate band members.

History
The Beginning: An ROTC Band (1920-1929):

In the fall of 1920, Mr. Ralph A. Van Wye, a student in the College of Engineering, had just returned to the University of Cincinnati after a tour of duty in the US Army during World War I as an army bandsman. At the time, ROTC was compulsory for all male students at the University of Cincinnati. Since Mr. Van Wye had just completed two years of army service, he did not feel obligated to continue as a member of ROTC on campus, requesting to have his requirement waived. However, when the commandant saw that he was an army bandsman, he told Mr. Van Wye that he was just the man they needed. They wanted to organize an ROTC band, but had no one available to serve as bandmaster. Rather than being excused from ROTC, Mr. Van Wye was appointed as bandmaster to the first University of Cincinnati ROTC band. That fall Mr. Ralph A. Van Wye held his first rehearsal in one of the laboratories in the College of Engineering. Eight members were in attendance. Looking back on the group, Mr. Van Wye humorously remarked, "The only letter we could form was the letter I". Mr. Van Wye continued as band director until his graduation in the spring of 1923. In September 1923, Sergeant Victor Norling transferred from Ft. Thomas, Kentucky to the ROTC detachment at the University of Cincinnati as the second band director. He remained in this position until 1929. Throughout these first nine years, the UC Band was an ROTC band, administered by the ROTC unit. In addition to performing at all ROTC functions, it also presented halftime shows at UC football games. At the Nippert Stadium Dedication Day game between Oberlin College and UC on November 8, 1924, the band made its first appearance in uniforms. In 1925, the bandsmen initiated the idea of the coed band sponsor, and in the same year elected Julia E. Sale their first band sponsor. Candidates from local sororities would be nominated for the band sponsor, who would then be selected each year at the band’s annual Fall banquet. This single female bandmember would provide a social “in” to the world of dating for the all-male band. During Sgt. Norling's tenure as director, the UC Band also began making trips with the team to some of the away football games.

The Transitioning Years: A Student Group (1929-1942):

In 1929 Colonel R. A. Aderegg, Assistant Dean of the College of Engineering, was appointed faculty advisor to the band. In the fall of 1929, Merrill B. Van Pelt assumed the position of director of the UC Band. At this point the band shifted from an ROTC band to a student activity for all male students on campus. Up to this point, all membership had been from the College of Engineering. Mr. Van Pelt looked to change this and began recruiting students from other colleges. Among his recruiting efforts was the development of the "Varsity Vanities", a musical review sponsored by the UC Band in which students from all colleges and groups participated. During the 1930s the UC Band gained a national reputation at football games. Mr. Van Pelt and the UC Band were one of the first to use animated formations and dance steps in football halftime shows. The band also traveled extensive ly during these years.

World War II: Incorporation of Bandswomen (1942-1949):

The rise of World War II put an end to football games after the fall season of 1942. While the band stopped marching, it did not stop playing. Combined concerts with the Conservatory Symphonic Band were held, while the band also played for all formal military functions and War Band Rallies. Throughout the first twenty-three years of its existence, the membership of the band was only men. However Due to the recruitment needs of World War II, only two bandsmen were left on campus from previous years by the fall of 1944. At this time, the UC Band began accepting women for membership on a temporary basis. For the remainder of World War II, membership in the band was predominantly female. Then with the close of World War II in 1945, football games resumed and the UC Band returned to perform on the football field, both men and women. The return of older band members in 1946 though created tension within the UC Band. Many of the returning men felt that the band should revert to its all male status. Their case eventually lost, and the band officially became coed. The 1946-1947 school year was highlighted by a trip to the Sun Bowl in El Paso, Texas, as the UC Football Team made its first appearance in a major bowl game. In the spring of 1947, Mr. Van Pelt submitted his resignation in order to devote full-time to his responsibilities as Supervisor of Instrumental Music in the Cincinnati Public Schools. The search for a new director brought Mr. Clarence E. Mills to the UC Band as its fourth overall director and first full-time director. Mr. Mills had recently been released from the Army where he had served as an Army bandmaster during World War II. He served as director from 1947 to 1949, completely reorganizing and branching the band into a precise, intricate marching Bearcat Band, two pep bands and an intramural band. Varsity Vanities continued, along with a Band Clinic that proved successful for area high school bands. It was during this period that the concert band began its development. In 1949 Mr. Mills left the University of Cincinnati in order to return to the Army as Special Services Officer.

The Expansion Years: The Bearcat Bands (1949-1970):

Mr. Robert Hamilton served as director of the band from 1949 until the spring of 1954, when he left to take a position in California. Mr. Hamilton introduced the "story-telling maneuver", adding a new dimension to halftime entertainment. In the spring of 1954, Dr. Roy Robert Hornyak became the sixth director of the UC Band. That fall he introduced the famed CHARGE down the stadium steps, and in 1955 he established the Bearkittens drill team. Due to the increased scope of the activities of the band, 1955 also saw the name of the organization changed to the plural: The University of Cincinnati Bearcat Bands. The UC Band's first Band Camp convened in the fall of 1958. Later that same year, the band was spotlighted on national television as they performed at Chicago's Wrigley Field for a Chicago Bears game. In 1959 the Bearcat Varsity Band joined the Concert Band and the Marching Band as one of the three basic units within the band organization. In 1964, a Stage Band program was initiated and quickly grew under the leadership of Mr. John Defoor, a former arranger for the UC Bands. In 1968 the Brass Band was discontinued and absorbed by the CCM Symphonic Band. The University Band program was incorporated into the College Conservatory of Music around this time as well. Due to increasing demands upon his ti me from other CCM obligations, Dr. Hornyak completed his tenure as director of the UC Bands in the spring of 1970.

The Seventies: Searching for Stability (1970-1979):

In September 1970, Dr. Robert Wojciak became the seventh director of the UC Bands. The band saw many national appearances through performing at Cincinnati Reds and Bengal games. In 1972, Harry McTerry took over as director of the UC Bands and focused on improving the driving marching and playing style of the UC Marching Band. The UC Band also performed at the 1972 National League Play-offs and World Series. In 1973, Prof. Woodrow Hodges became the ninth director of the UC Bands. During his tenure the band saw much travel with trips to Philadelphia, Disney World, Athens, Georgia, and Louisville. The band was met with great enthusiasm with each trip and received praise for its outstanding performances. The UC Marching Band also performed at the 1975 National League Play-offs and World Series, the 1976 World Series and a Monday Night Football for the Cincinnati Bengals. During Mr. Hodges tenure more emphasis was placed on the basketball Varsity Band. Under the leadership of "Woody", the UC Band was well known for its high-stepping marching style, original music arrangements, and powerful sound. After four action packed years, Mr. Hodges left to take a position in Wisconsin. The fall of 1977 marked the arrival of the tenth UC Marching Band director, Prof. Glenn Richter, former assistant director of the University of Texas Longhorn Band. Mr. Richter introduced the "show band" techniques of the southern marching bands, and created the UC Band Flag Corps, incorporating a new color and dimension to the band's performances. After two years with the UC Band, Mr. Richter headed further north to accept a position as director of the University of Michigan marching band.

Into the Modern Era: The Return of the CHARGE (1979-1994):

Dr. Terence G. Milligan, former director of the Northwest Missouri State University Bands, became the eleventh Director of Bands at UC in 1979. During "Doc's" time, the band went through a style change to the glide step that is currently used. In the fall of 1981, Dr. Milligan introduced the Rifle Line to complete the UC Color Guard. Dr. Milligan also reintroduced the tradition of charging down the stadium steps during pre-game that had been lost over the years. In the winter of 1986, students in the band organized the "Varsity Clown Band", which entertained the crowds at basketball games throughout the season. Although popular with the crowd, the Clown Band was disbanded after only two years of performance. In 1987 Mr. Eugene Corporon took the position as Director of Wind Studies at CCM. His new position at UC included responsibility for the Bearcat Bands, and so in the fall of 1988 he instituted "Campus Band". This new band was designed as a year-round concert band open to all students, faculty, and employees at the University of Cincinnati. Due to changes in the athletic department and the introduction of a new University Dance Team, the Bearkittens were disbanded in the fall of 1989. In 1993, the Bearcat Bands were dropped from CCM funding and for a brief period, the band found itself completely independent of any university sponsorship. Mr. Matthew McInturf, a CCM graduate student, was hired as the interim director of the UC Bands. In the spring of that year, the band was officially transferred from C CM to the Athletic Department. The band also went to an off campus location for band camp, the first time since it was moved on campus by Dr. Milligan. Student members in the band were very excited with the leadership change and off-site band camp, which created a much improved marching band for the 1993 season.

A New Era: The Modern Band (1994–Present):

In the fall of 1994, the beginning of the marching season brought Dr. Terren Frenz, Sr. to the UC Band as the thirteenth director. Under the baton of Dr. Frenz, several changes helped the UC Band evolve into a much more effective unit. The leadership of the band was transferred from the students of band council, who had been running the band in recent years, to Dr. Frenz. The 1990s were a time of great improvement in the image of the UC Band. New uniforms, provided by the university administration, gave the Band a much-needed face-lift. These new contemporary style uniforms debuted at the Humanitarian Bowl in Boise, Idaho in 1997. This trip marked the first bowl trip for the Bearcats since the Sun Bowl in 1956. However, bowl trips would become almost a regular occurrence at the turn of the century as the football team continued to improve. The year 1999 led to many innovations, including the first appearance of the UC Band at a professional football game in recent history when the Bengals celebrated their last game in Riverfront Stadium. Dr. Frenz would continue this relationship with the Bengals for many years to come. Also in 1999, the band welcomed assistant director Mr. David Martin, who would serve the band for over a decade. The same year, the Bearcat Bands was incorporated as its own independent Department under the Office of Student Life. In the Spring of 2000, the band was finally presented with a new, "temporary" facility in Armory Fieldhouse. This marked the first real home for the Bearcat Bands in almost 25 years and replaced its previous lodgings in the basement of Laurence Hall. The band would remain there until March 29, 2005 when the Rockwern Band Center was officially dedicated on May 26, 2005. Also in 2005, the university hired an additional assistant band director, Mr. Nick Angelis, bringing the staff to 3 full-time directors. The continued success of the basketball and football teams led to increased exposure for the band all throughout the first decade of the new millennium. Through this exposure and the development of the UC Bands as a whole, membership peaked at over 250 members in 2010. The same year, assistant director David Martin retired after many years of hard work and dedication to the UC Bearcat Bands. His retirement gave way to new assistant band director Dr. Jody Besse graduate from the University of Southern Mississippi. On May 3, 2017. the university announced Mr. Christopher Nichter (assistant director for The Pride of West Virginia as the new band director, replacing Dr. Besse who served as interim director for the last 5 months.

In order, the 13 band directions of the UC Bearcat Bands:
 1920 - 1923: Mr. Ralph Van Wye
 1923 - 1929: Sgt. Victor Norling
 1929 - 1947: Mr. Merrill B. Van Pelt
 1947 - 1949: Mr. Clarence E. Mills
 1949 - 1954: Mr. Robert Hamilton
 1954 - 1970: Dr. Roy Robert Hornyak
 1970 - 1972: Dr. Robert Wojciak
 1972 - 1973: Mr. Harry McTerry
 1973 - 1977: Prof. Woodrow Hodges
 1977 - 1979: Prof. Glenn Richter
 1979 - 1993: Dr. Terence G. Milligan
 1993 - 1994: Mr. Matthew McInturf
 1994–2016: Dr. Terren L. Frenz, Sr.
 2017: Dr. Jody Besse (Interim)
 2017–Present: Mr. Christopher Nichter

School songs
"Army Fanfare" - played at UC home games before the charge down the stadium stairs
"Cheer Cincinnati"- the fight song of the University of Cincinnati
"Red and Black"
"Give A Cheer"
"The University of Cincinnati Alma Mater"
"Down The Drive" - cadence played by the UC Drum Line
"Paw" - cadence played by the UC Drum Line written by Associate Director of Bands Nick Angelis
"Five-Second Cheer Dr. Who" - a combination of the fanfare of "Cheer Cincinnati" and the "Hey Song")

References

American Athletic Conference marching bands
Bearcat Bands
Musical groups established in 1920
1920 establishments in Ohio
Musical groups from Cincinnati